The UK Albums Chart is a weekly record chart based on sales of albums in the United Kingdom. The first weekly albums chart in the UK was published by Record Mirror in July 1956 – since then, 28 albums by deceased artists have posthumously reached number one. Until 2007, the chart was based solely on sales of physical albums; from 2007 onwards, it has also included albums sold through digital distribution. , the listing is created using Friday to Thursday record sales from more than 3,500 vendors across the UK. It is compiled by the Official Charts Company on behalf of the UK music industry, and each week's new number one is first announced on Friday evenings on The Radio 1 Chart Show.

The first deceased artist to top the UK Albums Chart was Otis Redding, who died in a plane crash on 10 December 1967. On 20 May 1968, Redding's sixth studio album, The Dock of the Bay, was released in the UK – three weeks later, it became his first and only UK number-one album. Since Redding, 14 further artists have posthumously topped the albums chart, of which three have done so more than twice. The first of these was American singer Eva Cassidy; after dying in 1996, three posthumous releases from Cassidy reached number one in consecutive years, 2001–03. The second musician to achieve this feat was American entertainer Elvis Presley. Following his death from a heart attack in August 1977, Presley's compilation album 40 Greatest climbed to number one within three weeks. Subsequent compilations ELV1S (2002), The King (2007), If I Can Dream (2015) and The Wonder of You (2016) also topped the chart. With If I Can Dream, Presley achieved his fourth posthumous number one, more than any other artist.

The death of a musician can often result in an immediate increase in sales of their albums. As UK chart commentator James Masterton remarked in December 1995: "Death is very commercial." Following his death in 2009, the number of purchases of Michael Jackson's albums grew significantly worldwide. In the UK, sales of the singer's albums increased by more than 80 times in a single day. On 28 June, Jackson's 2003 release Number Ones climbed 120 places to the top of the chart; the following week, his 2005 compilation The Essential Michael Jackson reached number one. The two albums spent a combined total of eight weeks at number one. Five of Jackson's records were featured in the top twenty biggest-selling albums of 2009's third quarter, and sales of his albums during the year lifted Warner/Chappell Music's share of the albums market to its highest level in nearly six years. In May 2014, Jackson's album Xscape topped the chart, making him the third musician to top the listing with three posthumous releases.

Like Jackson, British singer Amy Winehouse received a significant increase in sales after her death in 2011, when purchases of her albums grew 37 times over. This resulted in her 2006 album, Back to Black, returning to the top of the UK Albums Chart for three weeks and becoming the UK's biggest-selling album of the 21st century for three months before being overtaken by 21 by Adele. Four months later, Winehouse's first compilation album, Lioness: Hidden Treasures, became her second release to posthumously reach number one. Over the year following her death, 1.2 million copies of Winehouse's albums were sold.

Number ones

The following albums were all explicitly credited (either wholly or partially) to deceased artists when they reached number one on the UK Albums Chart. Albums featuring deceased artists who did not receive an explicit credit (e.g. as a member of a band or on a various artist compilation album or soundtrack) are not included.

References

External links
Official Albums Chart Top 100 at the Official Charts Company

Posthumous
Cultural aspects of death